Petra Mayer (November 30, 1974  November 13, 2021) was an American book review editor and journalist. She was a book editor at NPR, working in the Culture section, and was known for her coverage of the San Diego Comic-Con and organizing an interactive book recommendation guide called Book Concierge.

Life and career 
Mayer was born on November 30, 1974, in Washington, D.C., where she grew up. She earned her bachelor's degree in history at Amherst College in 1996. According to an interview with her mother, Elke Mayer, it was while studying there that she decided to begin a career in radio. While she was still in college, Mayer joined NPR as an engineering assistant intern.

In 1997, Mayer moved to Boston, Massachusetts, to work as a news writer at the public radio station WBUR. In 1998, she earned her master's degree in journalism at Columbia University, and was hired to work as an intern for Radio Free Europe/Radio Liberty, in Prague. Mayer worked there for two years as an archivist and audio editor.

Mayer returned to Washington, D.C. in 2000 and joined NPR. She worked in several positions within NPR, including as production assistant of Weekend Edition Saturday, and associate producer and director of All Things Considered. In 2012, Mayer joined the Culture section of NPR, where she worked as one of its two books editors. In 2020, Mayer was appointed the editor of NPR's video gaming column.

Death 
Mayer died on November 13, 2021, at the Holy Cross Hospital in Silver Spring, Maryland, from a pulmonary embolism. She was 46 years old.

References

External links 
NPR profile

1974 births
2021 deaths
20th-century American journalists
21st-century American journalists
American archivists
American radio reporters and correspondents
American women editors
American women journalists
Amherst College alumni
Columbia University Graduate School of Journalism alumni
Deaths from pulmonary embolism
NPR personalities
People from Washington, D.C.
20th-century American women
21st-century American women